Parastarte triquetra, or the brown gem clam, is a species of bivalve mollusc in the family Veneridae. It is found along the Atlantic coast of North America, from Florida to the West Indies.

References

Veneridae
Bivalves described in 1846